Gutterson is a surname. Notable people with the surname include:

 Albert Gutterson (1887–1965), American long jumper
 Daryl Gutterson (1953–2020), Australian rules footballer 
 Jim Gutterson (1939–2008), Australian rules footballer

See also
 Guterson